The Class 110 diesel multiple units were built by the Birmingham Railway Carriage and Wagon Company in conjunction with the Drewry Car Co. to operate services on the former Lancashire and Yorkshire main line. They originally entered service uniquely in this region, which earned them the name of the 'Calder Valley' sets.  They were an updated version of the Class 104, with more powerful engines, a revised cab design and raised bodyside window frames.

Description
The fact that they were primarily intended for services on the arduous Calder Valley route meant that Class 110 needed more power than other first generation DMUs, so they were fitted with  Rolls-Royce C6NFLH engines, and when delivered they had the highest hp/ton of any of the first generation DMUs, including the lightweights. With a set weighing 87½ tons (tare), this gave a power-to-weight ratio of 8.3 hp / ton, which was appreciably higher than any other DMU in use at the time using normally aspirated engines.

Each set had 24 first class and 159 second class seats.

Timeline
The first twenty sets, for the NER, were ordered in March 1959 and were allocated to Bradford Hammerton Street depot. The second batch were allocated to the LMR in January 1961, based at Newton Heath in Manchester. Deliveries of the two batches was concurrent, starting in 1961, and these were the penultimate class of first generation sets to be built.

All sets were concentrated at Hammerton Street by 1976.

Refurbishment of the class took place in 1979 - 1980, with fluorescent lighting, new seat covers, new internal panelling and mechanical modifications to reduce the occurrence of the fires in the exhaust system which were common on many classes of first generation DMU.

During refurbishment the class was repainted, first in the white livery with a blue stripe below the windows that was standard for refurbished DMUs and later in the standard British Rail blue and Grey livery. All sets that were turned out in the white livery were later repainted in blue and Grey.

The TSLs were removed from most sets and scrapped in 1982 to reduce maintenance costs and to allow a higher performance for an accelerated timetable on the Calder Valley line. At 11.2 hp/ton these sets now had by far the highest power/weight ratio of any first generation DMU, but with a significantly reduced capacity of just 111 seats.

At the same time all First Class seats were declassified to Second although the seats were not replaced.

The reduced capacity caused a problem with the upturn in traffic of the mid 1980s and some sets were supplemented in 1984–85 with centre cars from withdrawn Class 111 units.

Bradford Hammerton Street depot closed in 1984, and all remaining Class 110 units were transferred to Neville Hill in Leeds.

The small fleet size together with maintenance costs of the non-standard Rolls-Royce engines ensured their early withdrawal. The engines were mounted with cylinder heads facing inwards, unlike all other DMU classes, and this required specialised facilities for engine removal which were only available at their home depot. Class 150/2 'Sprinters' were introduced on the Calder Valley route in 1987.

Most displaced units continued in traffic until October 1989, but were no longer common in the Calder Valley.

Orders

Preservation

Five vehicles are preserved: 
 Lakeside & Haverthwaite Railway two-car set (52071 & 52077)
 East Lancashire Railway three-car set (51813 & 51842)

Model railways 
In 1982 Hornby Railways launched its first version of the BR Class 110 in OO gauge.

References

Motive Power Recognition: 3 DMUs. Colin J. Marsden
British Railway Pictorial: First Generation DMUs.  Kevin Robertson
British Rail Fleet Survey 8: Diesel Multiple Units- The First Generation.  Brian Haresnape
A Pictorial Record of British Railways Diesel Multiple Units.  Brian Golding

External links

 History of the Class 110s

110
BRCW multiple units
Train-related introductions in 1961